Jojoba oil  is the liquid produced in the seed of the Simmondsia chinensis (jojoba) plant, a shrub, which is native to southern Arizona, southern California, and northwestern Mexico. The oil makes up approximately 50% of the jojoba seed by weight. The terms "jojoba oil" and "jojoba wax" are often used interchangeably because the wax visually appears to be a mobile oil, but as a wax it is composed almost entirely (~97%) of mono-esters of long-chain fatty acids (wax ester) and alcohols (isopropyl jojobate), accompanied by only a tiny fraction of triglyceride esters. This composition accounts for its extreme shelf-life stability and extraordinary resistance to high temperatures, compared with true vegetable oils.

History 
The O'odham Native American tribe extracted the oil from jojoba seeds to treat sores and wounds. The collection and processing of the seed from naturally occurring stands marked the beginning of jojoba domestication in the early 1970s.

In 1943, natural resources of the U.S, including the jojoba oil, were used during war as additives to motor oil, transmission oil, and differential gear oil. Machine guns were lubricated and maintained with jojoba.

Appearance 
Unrefined jojoba oil appears as a clear golden liquid at room temperature with a slightly nutty odor. Refined jojoba oil is colorless and odorless. The melting point of jojoba oil is approximately 10 °C and the iodine value is approximately 80. Jojoba oil is relatively shelf-stable when compared with other vegetable oils mainly because it contains few triglycerides, unlike most other vegetable oils such as grape seed oil and coconut oil. It has an oxidative stability index of approximately 60, which means that it is more shelf-stable than safflower oil, canola oil, almond oil, or squalene but less than castor oil and coconut oil.

Chemistry 

The fatty acid content of Jojoba oil can vary significantly depending on the soil and climate in which the plant is grown, as well as when it is harvested and how the oil is processed. In general, it contains a high proportion of mono-unsaturated fatty acids, primarily 11-Eicosenoic acid (gondoic acid).

Uses 
Being derived from a plant that is slow-growing and difficult to cultivate, jojoba oil is mainly used for small-scale applications such as pharmaceuticals and cosmetics. Overall, it is used as a replacement for whale oil and its derivatives, such as cetyl alcohol. The ban on importing whale oil to the U.S. in 1971 led to the discovery that jojoba oil is "in many regards superior to sperm whale oil for applications in the cosmetics and other industries".

Jojoba oil is found as an additive in many cosmetic products, especially those marketed as being made from natural ingredients. In particular, such products commonly containing jojoba are lotions and moisturizers, hair shampoos and conditioners. The pure oil itself may also be used on skin, hair, or cuticles.

Like olestra, jojoba oil is edible but non-caloric and non-digestible, meaning the oil will pass out of the intestines unchanged and can mimic steatorrhea—a health condition characterized by the inability to digest or absorb normal dietary fats. Thus, this indigestible oil is present in the stool, but does not indicate an intestinal disease. If consumption of jojoba oil is discontinued in a healthy person, the indigestible oil in the stool will disappear. Jojoba oil also contains approximately 12.1% of the fatty acid erucic acid that would appear to have toxic effects on the heart at high enough doses, if it were digestible.

Although impractical, jojoba biodiesel has been explored as a sustainable fuel that can serve as a substitute for petroleum diesel.

See also 
 Oleochemical
 Simmondsia chinensis (jojoba) seed powder

Photo gallery

References

External links 
 International Jojoba Export Council
 
Description and chemical structure of jojoba oil
Can This Unassuming Little Desert Shrub Really Save The World? - The first article from 1977

Waxes
Vegetable oils
Cosmetics chemicals